Charles V. Hogan was an American politician who represented the 1st Essex District in the Massachusetts Senate for over 30 years.

Early life
Hogan was born on April 12, 1897 in Lynn, Massachusetts. He graduated from Suffolk University Law School in 1921.

Political career
Hogan was a member of the Massachusetts House of Representatives from 1935 to 1941. In 1940, he was elected to the Massachusetts Senate. He represented the 1st Essex District, which consisted of Lynn, Nahant, and Swampscott. He remained in the Senate until his death on August 7, 1971.

See also
 Massachusetts legislature: 1935–1936, 1937–1938, 1939, 1941–1942, 1943–1944, 1947–1948, 1949–1950, 1951–1952, 1955–1956

References

1897 births
1971 deaths
Suffolk University Law School alumni
Democratic Party Massachusetts state senators
Democratic Party members of the Massachusetts House of Representatives
Politicians from Lynn, Massachusetts
20th-century American politicians